Yvonne Jourjon (September 13, 1899 - September 1985) was a pioneering French pilot and flight instructor; she was the first woman flight instructor in France.

Life
Jourjon initially learned parachuting, and received her parachuting certificate in 1924. In 1932, she joined the Union of Civil Pilots of France and in the following year earned her pilot licence. On September 24, 1934, she flew with Madeleine Charnaux, who was attempting to break an altitude record; they succeeded, reaching 4,990 meters (16,371 feet). In 1936, she qualified as a flying instructor at the Aéro-club d'Ile-de-France.

In 1937, she beat the women's altitude record for light aircraft on a Farman Mosquito. In 1945, she became second lieutenant in the air force on the base of Châteauroux, then on that of Kasba Tadla in Morocco.

At the end of World War II Jourjon was chosen by Charles Tillon, a French government minister, to form a corps of female military pilots in the French army.

In 1970 Jourjon was recognised by the International Aeronautical Federation for her contribution to the aviation industry.

Jourjon died in September 1985 in Besançon.

In 2010, the town of Avrillé, Vendée named a street after Jourjon.

References

1899 births
1985 deaths
Aviation pioneers
Flight instructors
French women aviators
French aviation record holders
French women aviation record holders
20th-century French women